The American Institute For Roman Culture is a non-profit organization with classrooms located in Naples, Florida, United States, and Rome, Italy, to provide students with a full immersion into modern Italian culture while learning about the past.

Organization history

The American Institute for Roman Culture was founded in 2002 by American archaeologist Darius Arya and architect Tom Rankin. The organization is a non-profit 501(c)(3) founded in Massachusetts. In 2003, AIRC inaugurated its first project, the Post Aedem Castoris excavation in the Roman Forum with colleagues Jennifer Trimble, PhD (Stanford University) and Andrew Wilson PhD (Oxford University).  By its third and final season in 2005, AIRC students counted for 1/3 of the summer field school's participants.  The success of the Stanford/Oxford/AIRC collaboration led to two AIRC-organized and semester-long architecture programs with California Polytechnic State University  (Cal Poly, San Luis Obispo) and Northeastern University. From 2007 until 2011, AIRC hosted a semester Classics program and Maymester Program with the College of the Holy Cross,  Arya has served as AIRC's CEO/Executive Director since spring 2008, acting as principal fundraiser and liaison with the Italian Ministry of Culture.  In addition to Arya, AIRC staff includes Alberto Prieto, PhD (archaeology, video), Shelley Ruelle (academic programs), Simone Di Santi (video), and Erica Firpo (social media).

Study abroad programs
The AIRC offers study abroad programs for university students and scholars.

Semester Signature Program:
The AIRC offers a semester program that runs for 14 weeks with a one-week break, both in the fall and spring academic semesters. The program, entitled "History, Media, and Cultural Heritage", is open to university students and scholars from all majors, and consists of 3 core courses and a choice of 2 or 3 elective courses. 
 
The core courses are Rome: Layers of History, Discovering Italy, and Elementary Italian.

Elective courses offered include: Communications and Journalism in Italy; Social Media, Video, and Cultural Heritage; Late Medieval to Baroque Art History; Environmental and Geological Sciences of Rome; The City of Rome in Television and Cinema; as well as Latin and Greek.

Summer Programs: The AIRC conducts a variety of short-term programs in a broad range of topic areas during the summer months.

Archaeology Field School Excavation Program
A six-week intensive program held in June–July with one week of specialized academic instruction by archaeologists and AIRC professors and five weeks of on-site field work. The program includes visits to major Roman museums and open-air sites to augment field studies and provide participants with a broader context of what life was like in ancient Rome.

Documentary Film Program
This program runs for four to five weeks, in which participants learn the basics of shooting, editing, and producing as they document a cultural heritage site in or around Rome, in need of increased awareness and conservation.

Living Latin Program
An intensive program with PhD level professors of Latin who impart grammar, syntax, and vocabulary through related readings of poetry and prose from various moments in Rome's history. Students also engage with Latin as a spoken language. Morning classroom teaching is followed with afternoon walks through the city reading ancient authors in the locations where history happened, as well as inscriptions in their original locations.

Special Programs With Affiliated Universities

Documentary Film Program with Northeastern University
This program runs each summer for a four or five week session in which students from Northeastern University learn techniques of editing and production as they produce an actual documentary film based on a cultural heritage site of importance in Rome. In 2011, the students produced films on the historical port town of Ostia Antica.

Documentary film division

AIRC’s documentary film division produces original documentary films of cultural heritage sites in English, with the objective of exposing these sites to a wider audience than would be possible in Italian language only. AIRC’s experience with production began with Dr. Arya’s appearances in several documentaries for History Channel, National Geographic, and others. AIRC began video production in 2011 through its video documentary course in Rome with students from Northeastern University. In spring 2011, Fasti Online (the main digital database of active archaeological excavations in Italy) invited AIRC to produce short video documentaries of participating sites. AIRC has filmed six documentaries at sites in Rome and environs (Palatine and Oppian Hill, Sant'Omobono, Gabii, San Marco) and at Pompeii, and more than 35 other active archaeological projects have requested documentation by the AIRC.

Sustainability/conservation projects
 Ostia Antica Conservation Project
Santa Maria Antiqua in the Forum Romanum
The AIRC has been a participant in the funding of the important conservation of frescoes of the Santa Maria Antiqua Church in the Forum Romanum for the past five years.

Partnership with the Italian Ministry of Culture

The AIRC provides English language content translation for the Italian Ministry of Culture’s General Directorate of Management and Promotion of Cultural Heritage. This includes content for their social media platforms as well as the English-language version of the General Directorate’s website.

This partnership allows AIRC access to cultural heritage sites under the management and jurisdiction of the Italian Ministry of Culture, which helps AIRC to further its mission.

Annual "Unlisted" Conference
In 2011 the AIRC launched the "Unlisted" Conference. The conference is held each year in the spring, generally in March or April, for two days. Each participant presents and then submits an academic paper for the proceedings.

Sponsorship

The AIRC has been the recipient of numerous grants including an NEH grant, American Express Foundation grant for the Villa delle Vignacce excavation, World Monument Fund (WMF) collaboration for Santa Maria project, anonymous angel grants, numerous donations from supporters in California, Pennsylvania, Nevada, Illinois, Massachusetts, New York, Ohio, West Virginia and Georgia.

See also
 Rome
 Ostia Antica
 Villa delle Vignacce

References

Charities based in Massachusetts
Naples, Florida
Foreign charities operating in Italy
Organizations established in 2002
2002 establishments in the United States
Non-profit organizations based in Florida
501(c)(3) organizations